Robert Beatson Ross (23 September 1867 – 16 January 1949) was a Liberal Member of Parliament in New Zealand.

Early life and family
Ross was born on 23 September 1867 at Otama Station, near Waikaia in Southland, the son of Robert Ross. He was educated at Dunedin High School and joined the Railway Department as a clerk and telegraphist in 1883. He was subsequently appointed the postmaster and stationmaster for Dipton at 1888, and later held similar positions at Te Aroha and Lincoln Junction. Upon the death of his father in 1902 he left the railway service, then went to live on his farm at Riversdale. In 1903, Ross sold his farm interest and attained work with the Colonial Mutual Life Assurance Society, setting up practice in Woodville, Hawke's Bay.

Ross married Catherine Elizabeth Ryan in 1889, and the couple went on to have four daughters and one son.

Member of Parliament

While living in Southland, Ross unsuccessfully contested the Wakatipu seat in 1902. He won the Pahiatua electorate in the 1905 general election, and held it until 1911, when he was defeated by James Escott. He later attempted to regain the seat in the 1916 Pahiatua by-election, but was defeated.

Later life
Ross served on the Hawke's Bay Land Board and the Hawke's Bay Education Board. In 1924 he joined the Public Trust in Napier. He died in Wellington on 16 January 1949 and was buried at Karori Cemetery.

Notes

References

1867 births
1949 deaths
New Zealand Liberal Party MPs
Members of the New Zealand House of Representatives
New Zealand MPs for North Island electorates
Unsuccessful candidates in the 1902 New Zealand general election
Unsuccessful candidates in the 1911 New Zealand general election
Unsuccessful candidates in the 1919 New Zealand general election
People from Waikaia
People educated at Otago Boys' High School
Burials at Karori Cemetery